Herbert Albert (26 December 1903, in Bad Lausick – 15 September 1973) was a German conductor.

Albert was born in Lausick and died in Bad Reichenhall.  After studying with Karl Muck as a pianist he later held a succession of music director positions in Baden-Baden, Stuttgart and Breslau in the 1930s and 1940s.  From 1946 to 1948 he was principal conductor of the Leipzig Gewandhaus Orchestra.  He held further positions in Graz and Mannheim.

External links
Herbert Albert Biography 

1903 births
1973 deaths
People from Bad Lausick
German male conductors (music)
20th-century German conductors (music)
20th-century German male musicians